Daron Schoenrock (born November 21, 1961) is an American baseball coach and former pitcher. He played college baseball for the Tennessee Tech Golden Eagles from 1981 to 1984. He then served as the head coach of the Lincoln Memorial Railsplitters (1988–1989) and the Memphis Tigers (2005–2022). He is currently the pitching coach at Auburn.

Playing career
Schoenrock was a pitcher at Tennessee Tech, starting games in all four years before earning his degree in 1984.

Coaching career
After completing his studies at Tennessee Tech, Schoenrock became a graduate assistant coach for one season at his alma mater.  He then moved to Murray State where he completed a master's and served as an assistant for two seasons.  Schoenrock then earned his first head coaching position at Division II Lincoln Memorial.  He coached for two seasons with the Railsplitters, leading the team to their first postseason appearance in five years and earning conference coach of the year honors in 1989.  During that season, Lincoln Memorial played all of their games on the road due to work on their home stadium.

Following his stint with LMU, Schoenrock became a pitching coach at Birmingham–Southern, then an NAIA school.  In his eight seasons with the Panthers, he became a highly regarded pitching coach, authoring a book on all aspects of pitching, helping the Panthers reach the NAIA College World Series, and earning a summer posting as a short-season pitching coach in the Chicago White Sox organization in 1995.  He then began a series of short stints as a pitching coach at Southeastern Conference schools, working two years at Kentucky, two years at Georgia and three years at Mississippi State.  During this time, he coached a series of pro prospects, including Brandon Webb, Jonathan Papelbon, and Paul Maholm.

Schoenrock was named head coach of the Memphis Tigers before the 2005 season.  After a rough first year, he led the Tigers to 32 wins in his second season, marking the second best improvement in wins in the nation that year.  The Tigers appeared in the 2007 NCAA Tournament and frequently advance to the Conference USA baseball tournament under Schoenrock.  The team has also performed well in the classroom, posting GPA's well over 3.2 as a team.  These successes, as well as strong recruiting, have led to a contract extension for Schoenrock and helped build excitement for the Tigers' entry to the Big East Conference.

Schoenrock was named pitching coach for the Auburn Tigers on August 1, 2022.

Head coaching record
Below is a table of Schoenrock's yearly records as an NCAA head baseball coach.

Personal
Daron is the husband of the former Carol Cawood. They have been married since August 6th, 1988. They have two sons: Erik and Bret. Erik was selected by the San Diego Padres in the 11th round in the 2013 MLB First Year Player Draft after being named the 2013 Conference USA Pitcher of the Year.

References

Living people
1961 births
Sportspeople from Cedar Rapids, Iowa
Tennessee Tech Golden Eagles baseball players
Tennessee Tech Golden Eagles baseball coaches
Murray State Racers baseball coaches
Murray State University alumni
Lincoln Memorial Railsplitters baseball coaches
Birmingham–Southern Panthers baseball coaches
Kentucky Wildcats baseball coaches
Georgia Bulldogs baseball coaches
Mississippi State Bulldogs baseball coaches
Memphis Tigers baseball coaches
Auburn Tigers baseball coaches
Baseball coaches from Iowa